Klein-Sinaai is a village near the Dutch border in the Belgian municipality of Stekene in the province of East Flanders. Until 1977 it was a part of the municipality of Sinaai.

The abbey was founded in 1197 when Boudewijn of Boekel, a monk from St. Peter's Abbey in Ghent, settled in Klein-Sinaai as a hermit. In the early 13th century the abbey was recognised by the Bishop of Doornik. In 1578 the abbey was destroyed by Calvinists from Ghent, but was rebuilt a few years later, within the walls of Ghent itself.

The museum of cultural history in Sint-Niklaas exhibits several archaeological finds from Boudelo Abbey.

In 1877, a railway station opened on the Sint-Gillis-Waas to Zelzate railway. The line closed for passengers in 1952 and the track was removed in 1974.

Gallery

References

External link

Stekene
Populated places in East Flanders